Helicius is a genus of the spider family Salticidae (jumping spiders).

Species
As of May 2017, the World Spider Catalog lists the following species in the genus:
 Helicius chikunii (Logunov & Marusik, 1999) – Russia
 Helicius cylindratus (Karsch, 1879) – Korea, Japan
 Helicius hillaryi Zabka, 1981 – Bhutan
 Helicius yaginumai Bohdanowicz & Prószyński, 1987 – Korea, Japan

References

Salticidae
Spiders of Asia
Salticidae genera